The following is a list of notable alumni, faculty, and others affiliated with Dalhousie University located in Halifax, Nova Scotia, Canada.

Alumni

Scientists
 Dr. Robert Ackman (MS 1952), O.C.omega-3 fatty acid research pioneer
 Martin Henry Dawson (BA 1916)pioneer in penicillin therapy
 Dr. Erik Demaine (BSc. 1993)  youngest professor ever hired at Massachusetts Institute of Technology
 Danielle Fong (BSc. 2005)  pioneer in green energy
 Trudy Mackay (BSc, MSc), quantitative geneticist, winner of the Wolf Prize in Agriculture in 2016
 Arthur B. McDonald (BSc, MSc)  Nobel Laureate: 2015 Nobel Prize in Physics
 Dr. Kathryn D. Sullivan (PhD 1978)  NASA astronaut, first American woman to walk in space
 Ban Tsui (Dip. Eng., BSc, MSc, MD)  described the Tsui Test and developed a catheter over needle kit for peripheral nerve block
Mary Anne White, O.C. multi-award-winning materials scientist and educator

Government and politics

Prime Ministers
 Rt. Hon. Frank Bainimarama Prime Minister of Fiji
 Rt. Hon. Richard Bedford Bennett11th Prime Minister of Canada; only Canadian prime minister raised to the English peerage as 1st Viscount Bennett
 Rt. Hon. Joe Clark16th Prime Minister of Canada
 Rt. Hon. Brian Mulroney (law, continued at Université Laval) 18th Prime Minister of Canada

Lieutenant Governors
 Hon. Myra FreemanO.NSphilanthropist, Lieutenant Governor of Nova Scotia
 Clarence Gosse, O.C.24th Lieutenant Governor of Nova Scotia
 Arthur Maxwell House, O.C.neurologist and a former Lieutenant-Governor of Newfoundland and Labrador
 Henry Poole MacKeen, O.C.22nd Lieutenant Governor of Nova Scotia
 Sir John Robert NicholsonOBEbusinessman, politician and Lieutenant Governor of British Columbia
 Hon. Fabian O'DeaLieutenant Governor of Newfoundland and Labrador
 Sir Albert Walshchief justice and first Lieutenant Governor for Newfoundland

Diplomats
 Michael Leir Canadian High Commissioner to Australia
 Kishore Mahbubani Former President of the United Nations Security Council and Ambassador of the Republic of Singapore to the United Nations, Dean of the Lee Kuan Yew School of Public Policy at National University of Singapore (NUS)
 Audri Mukhopadhyay Canadian Diplomat and economist

Premiers
 Allan Emrys Blakeneytenth Premier of Saskatchewan
 John Buchanan20th Premier of Nova Scotia, senator
 Alex Campbell23rd Premier of Prince Edward Island
 Amor De Cosmos2nd Premier of British Columbia
 Hon. Darrell Dexter27th Premier of Nova Scotia
 Joseph Atallah Ghiz27th Premier of Prince Edward Island and former Dean of Dalhousie Law School
 Dr. John Hamm25th Premier of Nova Scotia
 Richard Bennett Hatfieldformer Premier of New Brunswick
 Angus Lewis MacDonald (1921)13th Premier of Nova Scotia
 Russell MacLellan24th Premier of Nova Scotia
 Hon. Jim Prentice16th Premier of Alberta, federal cabinet minister
 Gerald Regan (1952)former Liberal Premier of Nova Scotia
 Hon. Robert StanfieldPremier of Nova Scotia and leader of the Federal Progressive Conservatives
 Danny Williams9th Premier of Newfoundland and Labrador

Other notable politicians and political actors
 Dr. Abdullah bin Abdulaziz Al Rabiah – Saudi Health Minister and pediatric surgeon
 Chris Axworthyprofessor and Federal NDP politician
 Jamie Baillieformer Credit Union Atlantic CEO, leader of the Progressive Conservative Party of Nova Scotia
 Frank Bainimaramamilitary dictator of Fiji
 Dominic Cardy  leader, New Brunswick New Democratic Party
 Ches Crosbie  Rhodes Scholar 1976, NL Leader of the Opposition
 Hon. John Crosbieformer Canadian Minister of Finance, current Lieutenant Governor of Newfoundland and Labrador
 David Charles Dingwall (B.Comm 1974, LL.B. 1979)former Liberal cabinet minister
 Hon. Peter MacKayMinister of National Defense
 Judy Manning former cabinet Minister, Newfoundland and Labrador
 Stewart McInnes (1961)former Conservative Cabinet Minister
Hon. Anne McLellan, O.C.law professor and former Liberal deputy Prime Minister
 Christine Melnickprovincial NDP cabinet minister, Manitoba
 Reid Mordenformer Canadian Security Intelligence Service director
Cristelle Pratt, Assistant Secretary-General for the Environment and Climate Action, Organisation of African, Caribbean and Pacific States
 Hon. Gerald Reganformer Liberal cabinet minister
 Graham Steele (1989), Minister of Finance of Nova Scotia, Member of the Nova Scotia Legislature
 Hon. Sidney Smithpresident of University of Toronto, Conservative Party Secretary of State for External Affairs

Mayors
 William G. Adamsformer mayor of St. John's, Newfoundland
 Peter J. Kelly former mayor of the Halifax Regional Municipality, Nova Scotia
 John W. Morgan former mayor of the Cape Breton Regional Municipality, Nova Scotia
 Mike Savage mayor of the Halifax Regional Municipality, Nova Scotia

Academia
 Stephen BlackwoodPresident of Ralston College
 Philip BrydenDean of Law at University of New Brunswick (2004-2009) and University of Alberta (2009-)
 Robert MacGregor Dawson political scientist
 Elizabeth Rollins Epperly author and former president of the University of Prince Edward Island
 Howard Epstein (LL.B. 1973, faculty)MLA for Halifax Chebucto
 Edgar Gold O.C. expert in international ocean law and marine and environmental policy 
 T. A. Goudgephilosopher
 Colleen HanyczPresident of La Salle University
 Donald Olding Hebbfather of modern neuropsychology
 Albert Ross Hillpresident of the University of Missouri (1908–21)
 Peter Hochachka (MS), O.C.professor and zoologist
 George Laurencenuclear physicist 
 Ronald St. John Macdonald (B. Law 1952), O.C.law professor and international law expert
 Hugh MacLennan, O.C., O.Q.author and professor 
 H. R. Milner (B.Law 1911) – lawyer, businessman, and former Chancellor of University of King's College
 Moses Morgan (B.A.) – former president of Memorial University of Newfoundland
 Alvin Shrier (Ph.D.) – professor of physiology and Hosmer Chair in Physiology at McGill University

Business
 Purdy Crawford, O.C. (LL.B. 1955)corporate director, former CEO of Imasco
 Frank Manning CovertCBE, O.C.—lawyer and businessperson
 Sir Graham Day (1959)former chairman of Cadbury Schweppes plc, Hydro One, as well as CEO of British Shipbuilders and the Rover Group
 Sir James Hamet Dunnmajor Canadian financier and industrialist
 Sean Durfy (B.Comm 1989)President and CEO of WestJet
 Fred Fountain lawyer, businessman, philanthropist, and Member of the Order of Canada
 Andrew Kam (B.Comm 1984, MBA 1986) former CEO of Hong Kong Disneyland
 Charles Peter McColoughCEO of Xerox
 Denis Stairs, B.Eng. OBE, Canadian engineer and businessman
 Maury Van Vliet, O.C.president and CEO of the 1978 Commonwealth Games

Law and lawmaking

Justices
 Sir Joseph Andrew Chisholm, KBEformer Mayor of Halifax and Chief Justice of the Supreme Court of Nova Scotia
 Donald L. Clancy, Q.C.former Justice of the Supreme Court of British Columbia and member of the British Columbia Review Board
 Lorne Clarkeformer Chief Justice of the Supreme Court of Nova Scotia
 Patrick H. CurranChief Judge of the Nova Scotia Provincial Court
 John DoullJustice of the Supreme Court of Canada, also provincial politician
 Constance Glube (1955)former Chief Justice of Nova Scotia, first female Chief Justice of Canada
 Alexander Hickman, O.C. (1947)Supreme Court of Newfoundland as Chief Justice 
 Joseph Phillip KennedyChief Justice of the Supreme Court of Nova Scotia
 Leslie M. Little (1961)co-founding partner of Thorsteinssons; Justice of the federal Tax Court of Canada
 John Keiller MacKay, O.C. (1922)former judge of Supreme Court of Ontario and Lieutenant Governor of Ontario
 Valerie L. Marshall (1991)Puisne Justice of the Supreme Court of Newfoundland and Labrador
 Valerie Miller (1985)Justice of the Tax Court of Canada
 Hon. Edmund Leslie Newcombe (B.A. 1878, M.A. 1881, faculty)Justice of the Supreme Court of Canada
 Roland Ritchie, C.C. (part-time faculty)Justice of the Supreme Court of Canada
 Eugene Rossiter (1978)Associate Chief Judge, Tax Court of Canada
 Jamie Saunders (1973)Justice of the Nova Scotia Provincial Court of Appeal
 Robert SedgewickJustice of the Supreme Court of Canada
 Clyde Wells (1962)provincial Chief Justice of the Court of Appeal and 5th Premier of Newfoundland and Labrador
 Bertha Wilson, O.C.first woman Justice of the Supreme Court of Canada

Attorneys General
 Murdoch MacPhersonAttorney-General of Saskatchewan
 Geoff Plant (LL.B. 1981)Attorney General of British Columbia

Legislators
 Hon. Scott BrisonMember of Parliament, former Liberal cabinet minister
 T.J. Burkeprovincial politician, New Brunswick
 Hon. Gerry ByrneMember of Parliament
 Terry DonahoeMLA and leader of the provincial Progressive Conservatives
 Andy Fillmoreincumbent Member of Parliament for Halifax
 George Fureysenator representing Newfoundland Labrador
 Danny Grahamformer leader of the Liberal Party of Nova Scotia
 Henry HicksSenator
 Michael J. L. Kirbyformer federal politician and current senator for Nova Scotia
 Megan LeslieMember of Parliament for Halifax
 Finlay MacDonald, O.C.senator representing Halifax, Nova Scotia
 John MacEachernpolitician, member of the Nova Scotia House of Assembly
 Hon. Donald Oliver (LL.B. 1964, faculty)first black male Canadian Senator
 Hon. Dr. Calvin Ruck, O.C.activist and senator
 Russell TroodLiberal Party senator for the state of Queensland, Australia

Activists
 Jan Crull Jr. (BA)  attorney, consultant, former Native American rights advocate, filmmaker, and investment banker
 Peter Dalglish (Law)international children's rights activist; founded Toronto-based Street Kids International
 Elizabeth May (LLB 1983)  President of the Sierra Club of Canada, leader of the Green Party of Canada
 Alexa McDonough (BA 1965)  former leader of the New Democratic Party
 Nick Wright (MBA, Law)  founding leader of the Green Party of Nova Scotia

Journalism
 Sandra Gwyn, O.C.journalist and writer
 Ian Hanomansing (Law)  television journalist
 Dr. Armand Leroi (BS1989)  evolutionary developmental biologist, author, and BBC documentarist
 Amber MacArthur (BA)  television and netcasting personality
 Robert MacNeilbroadcast journalist; co-anchored the nightly The MacNeil/Lehrer Report on PBS
 Marjorie WillisonCBC radio personality

Literature
 Ernest Bucklernovelist
 George Elliot ClarkeAuthor and recipient of the Governor General's Award
 Simon GrayEnglish playwright,  Commander of the Order of the British Empire
 Kenneth Lesliepoet
 Lucy Maud (L.M.) Montgomeryauthor of Anne of Green Gables (attended 1895, 1896)
 André Narbonneauthor
 James Macdonald Oxley (BA 1874)Lawyer and an author of books for boys
 Budge Wilsonauthor
 Lance Woolaverauthor, playwright and director

Performing arts
 Nobu Adilman (BA 1995)  musician and television personality*
 Kiran AhluwaliaSonglines Music Award-winning singer
 Jeremy Dutcher, classically-trained Canadian Indigenous tenor, composer, musicologist, 
 Jay Fergusonmusician for rock group Sloan
 Barbara Frisoperatic soprano
 Peter Herrndorf, O.C.president and CEO of the National Arts Centre
 Shaun Majumderactor/comedian
 Kate Makisinger-songwriter
 Chris Murphybassist and vocalist of rock group Sloan
 Oopali Operajita, (MA, 1981), choreographer and classical Indian danseuse, Distinguished Fellow, Carnegie Mellon University, USA
 Candy Palmater (LL.B. 1999)comedian, activist, writer, and radio-television personality
 Patrick Pentlandmusician for rock group Sloan
 Raylene Rankinsinger
Mary Vingoe (BA, 1976)playwright, theatre director, Member of the Order of Canada
Maureen Battconcert and opera artist

Sports
 Mark de JongeOlympic bronze medal paddler and world record holder
 Simon Farine  basketball player who currently plays for Ironi Nahariya of the Israeli Super League
 Stephen GilesOlympic silver medal paddler
 Colleen JonesCBC broadcaster, world champion curler
 Cary Kaplan (MBA 1994) founder of Cosmos Sports, president/GM Brampton Beast (ECHL) & Hamilton Bulldogs (AHL), CRO Global T20 Cricket. 
 Michael Scarolaworld championship bronze medalist paddler

Other
 Alex CameronAnglican bishop and son of Sandy Cameron
 Michael Donovanfilm producer, screenwriter, co-founder of Salter Street Films
 Omar Gandhiarchitect
 Sarah Jacksonartist
 Lesra Martinlawyer and motivational speaker
 John Norman Maclean (minister)Presbyterian minister, father of Norman Maclean, and character is several of his books
 Michel Trudeauson of Prime Minister Pierre Trudeau

Administration

Presidents

Chancellors

Notable faculty

 A. H. Armstrongclassicist
 Peter Aucoinpolitical science, public administration
 Said AwadProfessor Emeritus of Urology
 Jerome H. Barkowanthropologist
 Axel D. Beckechemist
 Michael Bishopliterary scholar
 Edward BlackadderProfessor of Medical Jurisprudence
 John Cameron, FRSEProfessor of Anatomy
 Lesley Choyceauthor
 James De MilleProfessor of English and Rhetoric
 Ford Doolittlebiochemist
 James Doullphilosopher, Professor of Classics
 John ForrestProfessor of History
 Edgar Z. Friedenbergeducationist
 John Godfreyhistorian
 Clarence GosseProfessor of Urology
 George Grantphilosopher
 Shauntay Grantauthor
 Roy Martin Haineshistorian
 Brian K. Hallbiologist
 William HareProfessor of Education and Philosophy
 C. D. Howeengineer, businessman, Liberal Cabinet minister
 Erin Johnsonchemist
 Michael John KeenDepartment of Geology professor (1961–77) and department chairman
 Thomas Worrall KentDean of Administrative Studies, adjunct professor of Public Administration
 George Lawsonbotanist
 Alexander H. Leightonpsychiatrist
 Roy Leitch  English composition
 Charles MacdonaldProfessor of Mathematics 
 Brian Mackay-Lyonsarchitect
 Arthur Stanley Mackenziephysicist
 Christine Macyarchitect, historian and the dean of the architecture and planning faculty
 Elisabeth Mann-BorgeseProfessor of Law
 Daniel Murraymathematician
 Cynthia Nevillehistorian
 Lars OsbergMcCulloch Professor of Economics
 E. C. Pielouecologist
 Robert RosenProfessor of Biophysics
 Malcolm Rossliterary critic
 Eric SegelbergProfessor of Classics
 Wilfred Cantwell SmithProfessor of Religion
 Colin Starnesprofessor, author and former President of the University of King's College
 Keith R. Thompsonprofessor; Department of Oceanography; Department of Mathematics and Statistics
 Steve Tittlecomposer
 Peter Busby Waitehistorian, longtime Thomas McCulloch Professor of History 
 Richard WassersugProfessor of Anatomy and Neurobiology
 John Clarence WebsterGovernor of Dalhousie University in 1934
 Richard Chapman WeldonProfessor of Law
 Franklin White Professor and Head, Community Health and Epidemiology (1982–89); adjunct since 1989
 Boris Wormmarine ecologist
 Nissim Mannathukkaren Associate Professor

References

Dalhousie
Dalhousie University